The Juvenile Products Manufacturers Association, Inc. (JPMA) is a national trade organization that represents the juvenile industry defined as from prenatal to preschool. JPMA represents companies in the United States, Canada, and Mexico who manufacture, import and/or distribute infant products.

JPMA Certification 
JPMA has developed a comprehensive Certification Program to help guide parents and caregivers toward purchasing juvenile products that are built with safety in mind. The JPMA Certification Seal on a product tells consumers this product has been verified as conforming to the requirements established by ASTM, through independent laboratory testing and follow-up on-site inspection of the manufacturer's production line.

History 

The idea for JPMA was born in 1959 when a group of juvenile products manufacturers came together as the voice of the industry when the United States government imposed an automotive tax that applied to car seats. By pooling resources and streamlining their efforts, the manufacturers proved that the tax was unfair and it was revoked. Afterwards, the manufacturers recognized the need for an official association which would protect their interests and promote the entire industry. A group of manufacturers began to address the common issues facing the industry and in 1962, the organization obtained its charter and officially became recognized as the Juvenile Product Manufacturers Association.

Lobbying 

The JPMA's lobbying budget increased by a factor of four in 2008 (compared to 2007), concurrent with the CPSIA.

References

External links 
 JPMA Website
 ASTM International
 

Trade associations based in the United States